Willow is a hamlet in Ulster County, New York, United States. Willow has a post office with the ZIP code 12495, which opened on November 4, 1898.

References

Hamlets in Ulster County, New York
Hamlets in New York (state)